Megasurcula osawanoensis is an extinct species of sea snail, a marine gastropod mollusk in the family Pseudomelatomidae, the turrids and allies.

Distribution
Fossils of this marine species have been found in Middle Miocene strata in Japan.

References

osawanoensis